Sidensjö Church (Sidensjö kyrka) is a medieval church in the Diocese of Härnösand belonging to Sidensjö parish in the community of Sidensjö in Västernorrland County, Sweden.

Architecture and history
The church is a stone building in Romanesque style with a detached belfry in wood. The main part of the church was built during the 14th century, while the first sacristy on the northern side was built during the 15th century. After the Reformation, paintings were added to roofs and arches. The current sacristy is of wood and was built sometime in the middle of the 18th century and replaced an older sacristy of stone.

References 

Churches in the Diocese of Härnösand
Churches in Västernorrland County
13th-century churches in Sweden
Churches converted from the Roman Catholic Church to the Church of Sweden